Earl Martin Madery (August 17, 1918 – February 21, 2014) was an American sound engineer. He won an Oscar for Best Sound for the film Jaws.

Selected filmography
 Jaws (1975)

References

External links

1918 births
2014 deaths
American audio engineers
Best Sound Mixing Academy Award winners
People from Linn County, Iowa